Anosteira is an extinct genus of carettochelyid turtle from the Eocene to the Oligocene of Asia and North America.

Taxonomy 
After

 Anosteira manchuriana Zangerl, 1947 Liaoning, China, late Eocene
 Anosteira maomingensis Chow and Liu, 1955 Youkanwo Formation, Guangdong, China, Late Eocene
 Anosteira mongoliensis Gilmore, 1931 Inner Mongolia, China, Late Eocene-Oligocene
 Anosteira ornata Leidy, 1871 Bridger Formation, Wyoming, USA, Early Eocene
 Anosteira pulchra (Clark, 1932) Uinta Formation, Utah, USA, Middle Eocene (Lutetian)

References

Sources
 The Osteology of the Reptiles by Alfred Sherwood Romer
 Chinese Fossil Vertebrates by Spencer G. Lucas
 The Age of Dinosaurs in Russia and Mongolia by Michael J. Benton, Mikhail A. Shishkin, David M. Unwin, and Evgenii N. Kurochkin. p. 344.

External links
Anosteira in the Paleobiology Database

Carettochelyidae
Eocene turtles
Oligocene turtles
Cenozoic reptiles of Asia
Cenozoic reptiles of North America
Prehistoric turtle genera
Taxa named by Joseph Leidy